Rodion Mykhailovych Luka (born 29 October 1972) is a Ukrainian yachtsman, Merited Sports Master, silver medallist of the Olympic Games 2004, Class 49er World Champion 2005, European Champion, and Sportsman 2005 in Ukraine. In August 2015 Luka was elected as the President of the Sailing Federation of Ukraine.

Biography 
Rodion Luka was born on 29 October 1972 in a family of engineers. He went to the Vyshhorod (Ukraine, Kyiv region) secondary school. When he was 11, he quit playing the piano at the music school and took to sailing. He gained his first experience in this field during practice sessions at the Kyiv Reservoir.
In 1985, Luka bore the bell in sailing – he won the USSR (Ukrainian Soviet Socialist Republic) “Republican Regatta” and started preparing for the USSR (Union of Soviet Socialist Republics) Youth Championship.
In 1988, he won all the youth competitions, including the Ukrainian Championship and USSR (Union of Soviet Socialist Republics) Championship. Henceforward, Rodion Luka starts going in for sailing professionally.

Education 
1995 – graduated from National University of Physical Education and Sports of Ukraine specializing in “Professional and Olympic Sports Management”.
1999 – graduated from Kyiv State Maritime Academy with the specialization “Navigator, Ship Driver”.

Professional achievements 
Rodion Luka obtained his first international prize in 1993. He became the gold medallist in the Warnemünde Laser-Radial-Class Regatta, and bronze medallist in the European Championship in Sardinia (Italy).
In 1994, the sportsman captured silver of the European Championship in England and World Championship in Japan.
In 1996, Rodion Luka represents Ukraine in the Laser-Class Olympic Games.
Next year, he starts the Olympic Sydney 2000 49er-Class Campaign together with Georgiy Leonchuk.
In 1999, Rodion Luka obtains a license to compete in the Olympics 2000, where he ranks the tenth. Coincidently, he takes the title of the Champion of Australia and wins the bronze in the 49er-Class European Championship.
In 2000s, Rodion Luka made the greatest professional breakthrough in yachting sport. He and his team headed the list in the ISAF (International Sailing Federation) World Ranking (2002-2003), won the 49er-class championship and took the lead in the world ranking (2005).
In 2005, Rodion Luka obtains the title of the Sportsman of the Year in Ukraine according to the National Olympic Committee.
In 2008, he becomes a bronze medallist of the European and World Championships, and in 2012 – SB20-Class Champion of England, Russia and Europe.

Volvo Ocean Race 
In 2008-2009, Luka was the only Ukrainian who competed in the most prestigious Volvo Ocean Race global sailing regatta on the “Kasatka (Killer Whale)” yacht as a steersman.
Volvo Ocean Race makes the list of five most significant competitions of yachtsmen worldwide.

Coaching and training 
In 2012-2013, Rodion Luka works as the RC44-class coach.
In 2012, he establishes the yachting school – KievRacingYachtClub. The Club created the conditions for yachting for the people who have neither time, nor money to buy and maintain own yachts. The Club organizes amateur regattas; the Club teams continuously participate in international competitions.

Family 
Married. Wife – Anastasiia, children: Kirill and Sofia.

Career highlights

World Championships
1997 - Perth, 32nd, 49er
1998 - Bandol, 14th, 49er
1999 - Melbourne, 15th, 49er
2001 - Malcesine,  3rd, 49er
2002 - Hawaii, 5th, 49er
2003 - Cadiz,  3rd, 49er (with George Leonchuk)
2004 - Athens, 14th, 49er
2005 - Moscow,  1st, 49er
2006 - Aix-les-Bains, 9th, 49er (with George Leonchuk)
2007 - Cascais, 14th, 49er (with George Leonchuk)
2008 - Sorrento,  3rd, 49er (with George Leonchuk)
Summer Olympics
1996 - Atlanta, 35th, Laser
2000 - Sydney, 10th, 49er (with George Leonchuk)
2004 - Athens,  2nd, 49er (with George Leonchuk)
European Championships
1996 - Quiberon, 21st, Laser
1998 - Helsinki, 18th, 49er
2000 - Medemblik,  3rd, 49er
2001 - Brest, 4th, 49er
2002 - Grimstad, 8th, 49er
2003 - Laredo, 9th, 49er
2004 - Torbole sul Garda, 16th, 49er
2005 - Vallensbaek, 10th, 49er
2006 - Weymouth, 10th, 49er
2007 - Marsala, 13th, 49er (with George Leonchuk)
Other achievements
2000 - Kiel, Kieler Woche,  2nd, 49er
2001 - Medemblik, SPA Regatta,  1st, 49er
2001 - Kiel, Kieler Woche,  2nd, 49er
2002 - Medemblik, SPA Regatta,  2nd, 49er
2003 - Hyères, Semaine Olympique Française,  1st, 49er
2003 - Medemblik, SPA Regatta,  3rd, 49er
2005 - Miami, Rolex Miami OCR,  2nd, 49er
2006 - Miami, Rolex Miami OCR,  3rd, 49er
2006 - Miami, North American Championships,  3rd, 49er

External links 
 
 
 
 49er World Championships
 OUTTERIDGE And AUSTIN Win 49er World Title

1972 births
Living people
Ukrainian male sailors (sport)
Sailors at the 1996 Summer Olympics – Laser
Sailors at the 2000 Summer Olympics – 49er
Sailors at the 2004 Summer Olympics – 49er
Sailors at the 2008 Summer Olympics – 49er
Olympic sailors of Ukraine
Olympic silver medalists for Ukraine
Olympic medalists in sailing
Medalists at the 2004 Summer Olympics
49er class world champions
Volvo Ocean Race sailors
World champions in sailing for Ukraine